Papyrus Oxyrhynchus 290 (P. Oxy. 290 or P. Oxy. II 290) is a fragment of a Work on Embankments, in Greek. It was discovered in Oxyrhynchus. The manuscript was written on papyrus in the form of a sheet. It was written between 83-84. Currently it is housed in the University Museum (E 2761) of the University of Pennsylvania in Philadelphia.

Description 
The document is mutilated.

The document was written by an unknown author. It contains a Work on Embankments.

This papyrus was discovered by Grenfell and Hunt in 1897 in Oxyrhynchus. The text was published by Grenfell and Hunt in 1899.

See also 
 Oxyrhynchus Papyri

References 

290
1st-century manuscripts